Arsakeio Lyceum of Patras is a private high school in the suburb of Rio, Patras, Greece.

Facilities
Library
Computer Lab
Science Lab
Chemistry Lab

Courses
Arsakeio Includes all the General Knowledge lessons of High Schools in Greece.
Ancient Greek
Modern Greek
English
Mathematics
Mathematics and Statistics
Physics
Physics (General)
Economy
Scociology
Religion Lessons
Computers and Programming
Management
Greek Lessons
History
European History
Latin
Philosophy
Also includes
German, Spanish and French

Education in Patras
Private schools in Greece